Secret House Against the World is a studio album by Canadian hip hop musician Buck 65. It was released on WEA in 2005. The album features contributions from Tortoise, Gonzales, D-Styles, and Tim Rutili, among others.

Critical reception
At Metacritic, which assigns a weighted average score out of 100 to reviews from mainstream critics, Secret House Against the World received an average score of 71% based on 11 reviews, indicating "generally favorable reviews".

Mike Diver of Drowned in Sound gave the album an 8 out of 10, saying, "[Secret House Against the Worlds] obvious appeal lies entirely with its musical, or rather compositional, diversity." He added: "There's so much to love here that the personal-preference flotsam can be forgotten, allowed to drift away into a realm of listener ignorance. Sam Ubl of Pitchfork gave the album a 6.8 out of 10, saying: "In the past Buck seemed unsure of how to spit over his most country-flavored beats; here he's completely at ease." Meanwhile, Phil Udell of Hot Press gave the album a 4 out of 10, calling it "an incredibly difficult one to relate to or even enjoy."

The Wire listed the album on the "2005 Rewind" list.

Track listing

Charts

References

External links
 
 

2005 albums
Buck 65 albums
Warner Music Group albums
Avant-pop albums